LeConte Glacier is a  and  glacier in the U.S. state of Alaska. It flows southwest to the head of LeConte Bay. It was named in 1887 by U.S. Navy Lieutenant-Commander Charles M. Thomas in honor of a California geologist Joseph LeConte. According to John Muir's book about indigenous peoples of the area, the Tlingits called it “Huti [sic]” which he claimed derived from a mythical bird that produced sounds of thunder when it flapped its wings.

In 2019 acoustic observations found that the submarine part of LeConte Glacier melts significantly faster than previously predicted by scientific theory.

Being south of the 57th parallel north, LeConte Glacier is the southernmost tidewater glacier of the Northern Hemisphere.

The glacier is a popular tourist destination, with operators from nearby Petersburg and Wrangell running excursions to its calving face. Students from Petersburg High School visiting also regularly to monitor its historical retreat.

Also of the same namesake and part of the Alaska Marine Highway is the ferry M/V LeConte.

See also
 List of glaciers

References

Glaciers of Alaska
Glaciers of Petersburg Borough, Alaska